Thomas Buchanan  (born 30 July 1963) is a Unionist politician from Northern Ireland representing the Democratic Unionist Party (DUP). 

Buchanan has been a Member of the Northern Ireland Assembly (MLA) for  West Tyrone since 2003. He is also one of the DUP's members of the Northern Ireland Policing Board.

He was educated at Langfield Primary School, Castlederg Secondary School, and at Omagh Technical College. In 1993 he was elected to Omagh District Council and became its youngest member and in 2004 was voted Vice Chairman. He was elected to the Northern Ireland Assembly in 2003 being the only member from the DUP for West Tyrone until the 2007 election when he was joined by Allan Bresland who is originally from Donemana and is a member of Strabane District Council.

In July 2010, he complained about a display of bunting inside an Omagh bank that celebrated a success by the Tyrone GAA team. The bank had been sponsoring the Ulster Championship. Buchanan accused the Gaelic Athletic Association (GAA) of being a political and Irish republican organisation.

On 25 October 2013 Buchanan told school children attending a public event that homosexuality is an ‘abomination’.

Buchanan believes in creationism. In September 2016 he supported an event promoting the teaching of creationism in every school, stating that “I’m someone who believes in creationism and that the world was spoken into existence in six days by His power.”

References

1963 births
Living people
Politicians from County Tyrone
Members of Omagh District Council
Members of Strabane District Council
Democratic Unionist Party MLAs
Northern Ireland MLAs 2003–2007
Northern Ireland MLAs 2007–2011
Northern Ireland MLAs 2011–2016
Northern Ireland MLAs 2016–2017
Northern Ireland MLAs 2017–2022
Christian creationists
Northern Ireland MLAs 2022–2027